David Campbell (born October 3, 1957) is an American politician from the state of New Hampshire. A member of the Democratic Party, he served in the New Hampshire House of Representatives.

Campbell is an attorney from Nashua, New Hampshire. He graduated from Harvard College and Suffolk University Law School. In 2013, Nashua police investigated him for running over some ducks at the Crowne Plaza Hotel in Nashua.

References

External links
 

1957 births
Living people
Democratic Party members of the New Hampshire House of Representatives
Harvard College alumni
Suffolk University Law School alumni
Politicians from Nashua, New Hampshire
New Hampshire lawyers
Place of birth missing (living people)